Natchez may refer to:

Places
 Natchez, Alabama, United States
 Natchez, Indiana, United States
 Natchez, Louisiana, United States
 Natchez, Mississippi, a city in southwestern Mississippi, United States
 Grand Village of the Natchez, a site of Plaquemine culture in Adams County, Mississippi
 Natchez Trace, a historic trail from Natchez, Mississippi to Nashville, Tennessee
 Natchez Trace Parkway, a United States National Parkway

People with the name
 Naiche, also known as Natchez, the son of Cochise and last hereditary ruler of the Chiricahua Apaches

Peoples and cultures
 Natchez language, the language of the Natchez people
 Natchez people, a Native American nation, namesake of the Mississippi city

Arts, entertainment, and media
 Les Natchez, a novel by French author François-René de Chateaubriand
 The Natchez, a painting by Eugène Delacroix

Ships
 Natchez (boat), several vessels of the same name
 USS Natchez, three U.S. Navy ships of the same name

Other uses
 Natchez (horse), American racehorse

See also
 Naches (disambiguation)